Gratien Le Père (Versailles, 2 June 1769 – Poitiers, 1 August 1826) was a French civil engineer.

A former classmate of Bonaparte at Brienne, he became an engineer of 'Ponts et Chaussées' (bridges and roads). He and his brother Jacques-Marie Le Père both joined the French Campaign in Egypt and Syria and were both leading lights in the programmes aimed at levelling the Suez Isthmus.

References 

French civil engineers
French topographers
1769 births
1826 deaths
People from Versailles
19th-century French engineers